Meng Qianghua (born 13 May 1966) is a former professional tennis player from China.

Biography
Meng, who won a doubles gold medal with Xia Jiaping at the 1990 Asian Games, partnered with the same player at the 1992 Summer Olympics in Barcelona. They were beaten in the first round of the Olympic men's doubles by second seeded Swiss players Jakob Hlasek and Marc Rosset. 

During his career he played the doubles rubber in three Davis Cup ties for China.

References

External links
 
 
 

1966 births
Living people
Chinese male tennis players
Tennis players at the 1992 Summer Olympics
Olympic tennis players of China
Tennis players at the 1990 Asian Games
Medalists at the 1990 Asian Games
Asian Games gold medalists for China
Asian Games medalists in tennis
20th-century Chinese people